Lozotaenia kumatai is a species of moth of the family Tortricidae. It is found in Japan on the island of Hokkaido.

The wingspan is 22–24 mm. The forewings are ochrous brown, tinged with grey and strigulated (finely streaked) with dark brown. The basal area of the wing is overlaid with dark greyish brown. The hindwings are pale whitish grey, tinged with brown along the termen and dorsum.

References

Moths described in 1963
Archipini